Who Killed Jenny Langby? is a 1974 Australian television documentary directed by Donald Crombie and starring Peter Cummins, Julie Dawson and Anne Deveson.

External links

Who Killed Jenny Langby? at Oz Movies

1974 films
1974 television films
Australian documentary television films
1974 documentary films
Films directed by Donald Crombie
1970s English-language films